Taylor is a unisex given name mainly in use in English-speaking countries, including England and Wales, Scotland, Ireland, Canada, Australia, and New Zealand. The name Taylor also has been well used for characters on American and now some Australian soap operas. Variants include Tayla and Taylah; both are feminine.

People

Female
 Taylor Anderson (curler) (born 1995), American curler
 Taylor Beck (model), American model and actress
 Taylor Cole (born 1984), American actress and former fashion model
 Taylor Dayne, stage name of Leslie Wunderman (born 1962), American singer-songwriter and actress
 Taylor Hill (sprinter) (born 1996), British Virgin Islander sprinter
 Taylor Hill (model) (born 1996), American model
 Taylor Ibera (born 1991), American judoka and wrestler
 Taylor Jardine (born 1990), American singer and songwriter
 Taylor Johnson (tennis) (born 2000), American tennis player
 Taylor Jenkins Reid (born 1983), American novelist
 Taylor Momsen (born 1993), American musician, singer, and actress
 Taylor Russell (born 1994), Canadian actress
 Taylor Schilling (born 1984), American actress
 Taylor Small (born 1994), American politician
 Taylor Swift (born 1989), American singer-songwriter and actress
 Taylor Wilde, stage name of Shantelle Malawski (born 1986), American professional wrestler
 Taylor Winterstein (born 1989) Samoan-Australian online-influencer and anti-vaxxer
 Taylor Vancil (born 1991), retired American soccer player
 Tayla Alexander (born 2000), New Zealand singer
 Tayla Bresland (born 1996), Australian rules football player
 Tayla Carolina Pereira dos Santos (born 1992), Brazilian footballer
 Tayla Ford (born 1993), New Zealand Olympic wrestler
 Tayla Harris (born 1997), Australian rules football player
 Tayla Parx (born 1993), American singer-songwriter and actress
 Tayla Roberts (born 1993), Australian basketball player
 Tayla Thorn (born 1998), Australian rules football player

Male
 Taylor Adams (born 1993), Australian football player
 Taylor Anderson, American author, gunsmith, re-enactor, and history professor
 Taylor Antrim (born 1974), American writer and editor
 Taylor Beck (ice hockey) (born 1991), Canadian ice hockey player
 Taylor Bennett (American football) (born 1985), American politician and college football player
 Taylor Bennett (rapper) (born 1996), American hip hop artist
 Taylor Bertolet (born 1992), American football player
 Taylor Booth (mathematician) (1933–1986), American mathematician
 Taylor Branch (born 1947), American author and historian
 Taylor Buchholz (born 1981), American baseball player
 Taylor Chace (born 1986), American sledge hockey player
 Taylor Clarke (born 1993), American baseball player
 Taylor Cornelius (born 1995), American football player
 Taylor Decker (born 1993), American football player
 Taylor Dent (born 1981), American tennis player
 Taylor Deupree (born 1971), American musician, photographer, and graphic designer
 Taylor Douthit (1901–1986), American baseball player
 Taylor Duncan (1953–2004), American baseball player
 Taylor Edgar (born 1987), American stand-up comic and musician
 Taylor Eigsti (born 1984), American jazz pianist and composer
 Taylor Fletcher (born 1990), American Nordic combined skier
 Taylor Fritz (born 1997), American tennis player
 Taylor Gabriel (born 1991), American football player
 Taylor Gold (born 1993), American Olympic snowboarder
 Taylor Graham (born 1980), American soccer player
 Taylor Griffin (born 1986), American basketball player
 Taylor Guerrieri (born 1992), American baseball player
 Taylor Gushue (born 1993), American baseball player
 Taylor Hall (born 1991), Canadian ice hockey player
 Taylor Hall (ice hockey, born 1964), (born 1964), Canadian ice hockey player
 Taylor Hanson (born 1983), American musician, Hanson
 Taylor Hawkins (born 1972-2022), American musician, Foo Fighters
 Taylor Hearn (American football) (born 1996), American football player
 Taylor Hearn (born 1994), American baseball player
 Taylor Heinicke (born 1993), American football quarterback
 Taylor Hicks (born 1976), American singer, winner of American Idol
 Taylor Hill (baseball) (born 1989), American baseball pitcher
 Taylor Jacobs (born 1981), American football player
 Taylor Jensen (born 1984), American longboard surfrider
 Taylor Johnson (rugby league), British rugby player
 Taylor Jones (born 1993), American baseball player
 Taylor Jordan (born 1989), American baseball player
 Taylor Jungmann (born 1989), American baseball player
 Taylor Kemp (born 1990), American soccer player
 Taylor King (born 1988), American basketball player
 Taylor Kinney (born 1981), American actor and model
 Taylor Kitsch (born 1981), Canadian actor and model
 Taylor Knox (born 1971), American surfer
 Taylor Lautner (born 1992), American actor
 Taylor Mays (born 1988), American football player
 Taylor McWilliams (born 1980/1981), American real estate developer
 Taylor Moton (born 1994), American football player
 Taylor Motter (born 1989), American baseball player
 Taylor Negron (1957–2015), American actor, comedian, painter, and playwright
 Taylor Rapp (born 1997), American football player
 Taylor Reed (born 1991), American football player
 Taylor Rochestie (born 1985) American basketball player
 Taylor Rogers (born 1990), American baseball player
 Taylor Russolino (born 1989), American football player
 Taylor Stallworth (born 1995), American football player
 Taylor Trammell (born 1997), American baseball player
 Taylor Wang (born 1940), Chinese-American scientist
 Taylor Walker (born 1990), Australian rules footballer
 Taylor Walls (born 1996), American baseball player
 Taylor Ward (born 1993), American baseball player
 Taylor Weyeneth (born 1993), American Deputy Chief of Staff for the Office of National Drug Control Policy 
 Taylor Widener (born 1994), American baseball player
 Taylor Williams (born 1991), American baseball player
 Taylor Wilson (born 1994), American nuclear scientist
 Taylor York (born 1989), American musician, Paramore

Fictional characters
Taylor, contestant on Total Drama: Ridonculous Race
Taylor Earhardt, Yellow Ranger in the TV series Power Rangers: Wild Force
Taylor Hayes, character in the American soap opera The Bold and the Beautiful
Taylor McKessie, character in the High School Musical film series
Taylor Townsend (The O.C.), character in the American television series The O.C.

See also
Taylor (surname)
Tay (nickname)

References

English unisex given names
Given names originating from a surname
English-language unisex given names
Feminine given names
Masculine given names
English masculine given names
English feminine given names